"The Man Who Came Early" is a science fiction short story by Danish-American author Poul Anderson. Similar in some respects to Mark Twain's A Connecticut Yankee in King Arthur's Court, the story is in fact its antithesis; Anderson sharply differs from Twain in his treatment of the "primitive" society in which the time traveller finds himself, and his assessment of a modern person's chances of survival in such a society. 

"The Man Who Came Early" was first published in the June 1956 issue of The Magazine of Fantasy and Science Fiction. It was reprinted in The Best from Fantasy and Science Fiction, Sixth Series and the Anderson collection The Horn of Time. In the 2010 collection Fragile and Distant Suns, this story is included under the name "Early Rise".

Plot
The story is presented in the first person, related by a Saga-Age Icelander named Ospak Ulfsson. During a violent thunderstorm, an unexplained phenomenon transports the titular 20th-century American US Army MP back in time to Ospak's homestead. The American, who becomes known as Gerald "Samsson", is an engineering student drafted to serve at Keflavik during the Cold War between the U.S. and the Soviet Union.

Gerald is taken in by Ospak's family who assume him to be a shipwreck survivor.  Although his engineering background gives him many ideas of how to improve life for the Icelanders (such as advanced sailing vessels), his lack of practical know-how, and his oversophisticated ideas when set against the nature of 10th-century life, lead to none of his suggestions being implemented. Knowledge of 20th-century metallurgy does not endow him with the highly specialised skill needed to work in a 10th-century smithy, and his attempt to do so ends with a costly fiasco. Also, knowing the theory of how to design a large metal bridge is not a sufficient base for constructing a small wooden bridge over a rivulet with medieval carpentry tools.

There is also a whole series of misunderstandings caused by social and cultural differences. Gerald tries to tell the Icelanders that in his country there are no blood feuds because the government takes care of punishing all wrong-doers. However, his listeners have no concept of a vast
impersonal government and its law-enforcement agencies; Gerald's words, when translated into concepts familiar to his listeners, are taken to mean that all law-enforcement is done by the King in person – whereupon the amused Icelanders remark that such a King would be too busy to beget an heir. And conversely, when Gerald tells that he had been a military policeman and describes the task of one, they are astonished at what they see as his foolhardy courage of "offending all the men in the war host" - since Vikings would absolutely not have tolerated the petty regulation of their dress and personal life which is common for soldiers in a 20th-century army.    

Then, Gerald guilelessly mentions that his family owns no land and lives in one apartment of a big house where many other families live - not realizing that he has just plunged his social status sharply down, as in this rural society a landless man is far down the scale. And when he boasts that the United States is a free society, but admits that US citizens may be called up for military service even at harvest time, his shocked hosts conclude that the US is the worst and most monstrous of tyrannies - since in their economy, calling up the farmers in harvest time would doom their families to starvation, unaware that in modern times far fewer people need to farm.

Meanwhile, Gerald and his host's daughter fall in love with each other. A rival suitor from a neighboring clan, annoyed at her preference for the "useless" foreigner, insults Gerald, who then challenges him to "fight it out" - not realizing that in this society, duels between free people are fought with weapons and often to the death, and that fighting bare-handed "is for slaves". Trapped in a holmgang and about to be cut down, he uses his gun and kills his opponent, which is deemed dishonorable and thus not protected as a lawful killing during the duel.

In order to avert his host becoming entangled in a blood feud, Gerald departs on his own - which leads to his being outlawed and hunted down. When making his last stand, his ammunition runs out ("his magical weapon failed him" as the locals see it) but he gives a good account of himself with a sword seized from a fallen opponent before being finally killed.

The ending of the story suggests that, in time, Gerald's burial barrow would come to be regarded as the tomb of "an ancient hero" and that he would in death find the place in Icelandic society which he did not gain in life.

Reception
Steven H Silver has described the story as "a response to" L. Sprague de Camp's Lest Darkness Fall, while Jo Walton states that it is an outright rejection of de Camp.

Black Gate considers it "first rate", while Paul A. Carter states that, as a "tale of the modern man displaced in time to a harsh and unforgiving environment which dooms him", it is "more sophisticated" than Nat Schachner's "Master Gerald of Cambray".

Notes

External links 
 
 "The Man Who Came Early" on the Internet Archive

Short stories by Poul Anderson
1956 short stories
Short fiction about time travel